Union Township is a township in Mitchell County, Iowa, USA.

History
Union Township was established in 1868.

References

Townships in Mitchell County, Iowa
Townships in Iowa